Ian Mark Roberts (born 28 February 1961) is a Welsh former professional footballer who played as a midfielder. He played in the English Football League for Wrexham, and also played for Bangor City.

References

1961 births
Living people
Welsh footballers
Association football midfielders
Wrexham A.F.C. players
Bangor City F.C. players
English Football League players
People from Colwyn Bay
Sportspeople from Conwy County Borough